Anthony F. Shorrocks is a British development economist.

Academic career 

Between January 2001 and April 2009 he was Director of UNU-WIDER.
Prior to that he was Professor at the London School of Economics and before that he worked at the University of Essex. He has also had several visiting appointments in the US, Canada, Italy, and Russia.

He has many publications in leading economic journals on income and wealth distribution, inequality, poverty, and mobility.

Education 
His first degree was a B.Sc. in Mathematics from the University of Sussex. This was followed by a Masters in Economics from Brown University. He took his Ph.D. in Economics at the London School of Economics in 1973 (being awarded the Bowley Prize in 1975).

Shorrocks index 
In 1978, he introduced a measure based on income Gini coefficients to estimate income mobility. This measure, generalized by Maasoumi and Zandvakili, is now generally referred to as Shorrocks index, sometimes as Shorrocks mobility index or Shorrocks rigidity index. It attempts to estimate whether the income inequality Gini coefficient is permanent or temporary, and to what extent a country or region enables economic mobility to its people so that they can move from one (e.g. bottom 20%) income quantile to another (e.g. middle 20%) over time. In other words, Shorrocks index compares inequality of short-term earnings such as annual income of households, to inequality of long-term earnings such as 5-year or 10-year total income for same households.

Professional Recognition 
He has been elected to be a Fellow of the Econometric Society.

Noted works

Books

Chapters in books

Journal articles

References

External links 
UNU-WIDER: Anthony Shorrocks. Profile page for Anthony Shorrocks at UNU-WIDER.

1946 births
Alumni of the London School of Economics
Alumni of the University of Sussex
Brown University alumni
British development economists
Fellows of the Econometric Society
Living people